Joaquim is a 2017 Brazilian drama film directed by Marcelo Gomes. It was selected to compete for the Golden Bear in the main competition section of the 67th Berlin International Film Festival. In 2018, the film won the Havana Star Prize for Best Film, and Gomes for Best Director, at the 19th Havana Film Festival New York.

Cast
 Julio Machado
 Isabél Zuaa
 Nuno Lopes
 Rômulo Braga
 Welket Bungué
 Karay Rya Pua

References

External links
 

2017 films
2017 drama films
2010s Portuguese-language films
Brazilian drama films
Films directed by Marcelo Gomes